"Esquisse d'un Programme" (Sketch of a Programme) is a famous proposal for long-term mathematical research made by the German-born, French mathematician Alexander Grothendieck in 1984. He pursued the sequence of logically linked ideas in his important project proposal from 1984 until 1988, but his proposed research continues to date to be of major interest in several branches of advanced mathematics. Grothendieck's vision provides inspiration today for several developments in mathematics such as the extension and generalization of Galois theory, which is currently being extended based on his original proposal.

Brief history
Submitted in 1984, the Esquisse d'un Programme was a proposal submitted by Alexander Grothendieck for a position at the Centre National de la Recherche Scientifique. The proposal was not successful, but Grothendieck obtained a special position where, while keeping his affiliation at the University of Montpellier, he was paid by the CNRS and released of his teaching obligations. Grothendieck held this position from 1984 till 1988. This proposal was not formally published until 1997, because the author "could not be found, much less his permission requested". The outlines of dessins d'enfants, or "children's  drawings", and "Anabelian geometry", that are contained in this manuscript continue to inspire research; thus, "Anabelian geometry is a proposed theory in mathematics, describing the way the algebraic fundamental group G of an algebraic variety V, or some related geometric object, determines how V can be mapped into another geometric object W, under the assumption that G is not  an abelian group, in the sense of being strongly noncommutative. The word anabelian (an alpha privative an- before abelian) was introduced in Esquisse d'un Programme. While the work of Grothendieck was for many years unpublished, and unavailable through the traditional formal scholarly channels, the formulation and predictions of the proposed theory received much attention, and some alterations, at the hands of a number of mathematicians. Those who have researched in this area have obtained some expected and related results, and in the 21st century the beginnings of such a theory started to be available."

Abstract of Grothendieck's programme
("Sommaire")

1. The Proposal and enterprise ("Envoi"). 
2. "Teichmüller's Lego-game and the Galois group of Q over Q"  ("Un jeu de “Lego-Teichmüller” et le groupe de Galois de Q sur Q").
3. Number fields associated with dessins d'enfant". ("Corps de nombres associés à un dessin d’enfant").
4. Regular polyhedra over finite fields ("Polyèdres réguliers sur les corps finis").
5. General topology or a 'Moderated Topology' ("Haro sur la topologie dite 'générale', et réflexions heuristiques vers une topologie dite 'modérée").
6. Differentiable theories and moderated theories ("Théories différentiables" (à la Nash) et “théories modérées").
7. Pursuing Stacks ("À la Poursuite des Champs").
8. Two-dimensional geometry ("Digressions de géométrie bidimensionnelle").
9. Summary of proposed studies ("Bilan d’une activité enseignante").
10. Epilogue.
Notes

Suggested further reading for the interested mathematical reader is provided
in the References section.

Extensions of Galois's theory for groups: Galois groupoids, categories and functors
Galois developed a powerful, fundamental algebraic theory in mathematics that provides very efficient computations for certain algebraic problems by utilizing the algebraic concept of groups, which is now known as the theory of Galois groups; such computations were not possible before, and also in many cases are much more effective than the 'direct' calculations without using groups. To begin with, Alexander Grothendieck stated in his proposal: "Thus, the group of Galois is realized as the automorphism group of a concrete, pro-finite group which respects certain structures that are essential to this group." This fundamental, Galois group theory in mathematics has been considerably expanded, at first to groupoids- as proposed in Alexander Grothendieck's Esquisse d' un Programme (EdP)- and now already partially carried out for groupoids; the latter are now further developed beyond groupoids to categories by several groups of mathematicians. Here, we shall focus only on the well-established and fully validated extensions of Galois' theory. Thus, EdP also proposed and anticipated, along previous Alexander Grothendieck's IHÉS seminars (SGA1 to SGA4) held in the 1960s, the development of even more powerful extensions of the original Galois's theory for groups by utilizing categories, functors and natural transformations, as well as further expansion of the manifold of ideas presented in Alexander Grothendieck's Descent Theory. The notion of motive has also been pursued actively. This was developed into the motivic Galois group, Grothendieck topology and Grothendieck category
. Such developments were recently extended in algebraic topology via representable functors and the fundamental groupoid functor.

See also

 Anabelian geometry
 Grothendieck's Galois theory
 Grothendieck's Séminaire de géométrie algébrique
 Stratified space

References

Related works by Alexander Grothendieck
Alexander Grothendieck. 1971, Revêtements Étales et Groupe Fondamental (SGA1), chapter VI: Catégories fibrées et descente, Lecture Notes in Math. 224, Springer-Verlag: Berlin. 
Alexander Grothendieck. 1957, Sur quelques points d'algèbre homologique, Tohoku Mathematics Journal, 9, 119-221.
Alexander Grothendieck and Jean Dieudonné.: 1960, Éléments de géométrie algébrique., Publ. Inst. des Hautes Études Scientifiques, (IHÉS), 4. 
Alexander Grothendieck et al.,1971. Séminaire de Géométrie Algébrique du Bois-Marie, Vol. 1-7, Berlin: Springer-Verlag.
Alexander Grothendieck. 1962. Séminaires en Géométrie Algébrique du Bois-Marie, Vol. 2 - Cohomologie Locale des Faisceaux Cohèrents et Théorèmes de Lefschetz Locaux et Globaux., pp. 287. (with an additional contributed exposé by Mme. Michele Raynaud). (Typewritten manuscript available in French; see also a brief summary in English References Cited: 
Jean-Pierre Serre. 1964. Cohomologie Galoisienne, Springer-Verlag: Berlin. 
J. L. Verdier. 1965. Algèbre homologiques et Catégories derivées. North Holland Publ. Cie).
Alexander Grothendieck et al. Séminaires en Géometrie Algèbrique- 4, Tome 1, Exposé 1 (or the Appendix to Exposée 1, by `N. Bourbaki) for more detail and a large number of results. AG4 is freely available in French; also available is an extensive Abstract in English.
Alexander Grothendieck, 1984.  "Esquisse d'un Programme", (1984 manuscript), finally published in "Geometric Galois Actions", L. Schneps, P. Lochak, eds., London Math. Soc. Lecture Notes 242, Cambridge University Press, 1997, pp. 5-48; English transl., ibid., pp. 243-283. .
Alexander Grothendieck, "La longue marche in à travers la théorie de Galois." = "The Long March Towards/Across the Theory of Galois", 1981 manuscript, University of Montpellier preprint series 1996, edited by J. Malgoire.

Other related publications
.

.

External links
 Fundamental Groupoid Functors, Planet Physics.
 The best rejected proposal ever, Never Ending Books, Lieven le Bruyn
 Notes Anabéliennes, A. Grothendieck.

Group theory
Algebraic geometry
Category theory
Algebraic topology
Mathematics papers
1983 documents